Troy Thompson may refer to:
 Troy Thompson (rugby league) (born 1979), rugby league player for the Canberra Raiders
 Troy Thompson (guitarist), guitarist in Christian metal band Bride